The 2014 European Parliament election took place in Italy on 25 May 2014.

In Lombardy the centre-left Democratic Party was by far the largest party with 40.3% of the vote, largely distancing Forza Italia (16.9%), the Five Star Movement (15.7%) and Lega Nord (14.6%). The centre-right's tally, including also the New Centre-Right (3.7), which ran in a joint list with the Union of the Centre, and Brothers of Italy (2.8%), was 37.9%: it was the first time ever that the centre-left topped the centre-right in a regionwide election. The three most voted candidates in Lombardy were Matteo Salvini (Lega Nord, 180,844), Alessia Mosca (Democratic Party, 141,780) and Giovanni Toti (Forza Italia, 116,120).

Results

References

Elections in Lombardy
European Parliament elections in Italy
2014 European Parliament election
2014 elections in Italy